The Feroz Award for Best Trailer (Spanish: Premio Feroz al mejor tráiler) is one of the annual awards given at the Feroz Awards, presented by the Asociación de Informadores Cinematográficos de España. It was first presented in 2014.

Winners and nominees

2010s

2020s

References

External links
 Official website

Feroz Awards
Awards established in 2014
2014 establishments in Spain